Dudley Zoological Gardens is a  zoo located within the grounds of Dudley Castle in the town of Dudley, in the Black Country region of the West Midlands, England. The Zoo opened to the public on 18 May 1937. It contains 12 modernist animal enclosures and other buildings designed by the architect Berthold Lubetkin and the Tecton Group. The zoo went into Justin  receivership in 1977 and was purchased by Dudley Metropolitan Council. Dudley Zoo is now operated by Dudley and West Midlands Zoological Society, founded in 1978 and a registered charity. The gardens also hosts multiple events.

History

The owner of Dudley Castle, the Third Earl of Dudley, decided to create a zoo in the castle grounds in the 1930s. The initial Board of the Dudley Zoological Society was made up of the earl, Ernest Marsh (director of Marsh and Baxter) and Captain Frank Cooper, owner of Oxford Zoo, who wanted to sell his animals and it was Oxford Zoo, which closed in 1936, that supplied Dudley with the majority of its initial collection of animals. The zoo was built between 1935 and 1937,  with Dr Geoffrey Vevers, the Superintendent at London Zoo acting as an advisor. Thirteen zoo buildings were designed by  Berthold Lubetkin and engineering was carried out by Ove Arup. The steepness of much of the terrain and the presence of caverns produced by limestone mining in previous centuries presented the architects and builders with a number of difficulties. Further constraints were presented by the castle being a scheduled monument, its structure and immediate surroundings being protected by a government department, the Office of Works.

The architects chose a deliberately modern style for the animal enclosures, entrance and visitor refreshment facilities, making no attempt to match the appearance of the castle ruins. The main material chosen for the construction was pre-stressed reinforced concrete which gave the possibility of forming curved structures and projecting platforms. It was decided to avoid cages where possible and to display the animals in a deliberately artificial manner rather than create an imitation of natural surroundings.

The zoo opened on 18 May 1937. The opening day was a great success, with over 250,000 people recorded as visiting the zoo on its opening day, 700,000 in its first year.

The opening weeks of the zoo were not always so positive though as on 18 June 1937, a Malayan Brown Bear escaped from the zoo, bit a Dudley resident, was struck by a policeman's truncheon and spent a few hours in local gardens before recapture. Just 3 days later the animal made another escape, this time being shot dead in the castle grounds.

Elephant rides were one of the attractions of the zoo from the beginning, as it was reported in April 1937 that two Indian elephants had been brought to Dudley with that purpose in mind.

A miniature railway was added in 1938 with two locomotives constructed by G & S Light Engineering, of Stourbridge. The locomotives ran on a track about 1 mile long, carrying up to 150 passengers.

In 1958 a chair lift was introduced to take visitors from near the entrance up the steep grass bank to near the elephant house. The chair lift was opened on 11 May 1958 by the comedian Richard Hearne.

The zoo was bought by the Scotia leisure group in 1970. In 1977, the zoo went into receivership but was bought by Dudley Metropolitan Council. Finally, in 1978, a charity, The Dudley and West Midlands Zoological Society was set up to run the zoo, although the council still owns the grounds.

In 1979, the Penguin Pool had to be demolished because of damage to the concrete caused by the salty water. This was the one major original animal enclosure to be lost.

On 23 October 2018 zoo staff shot dead an 8-year-old snow leopard named Margaash, after he had left his enclosure when a keeper failed to secure it. In a post to its website on 30 November 2018 the zoo confirmed that it was closed with no visitors on site at the time of the incident, and there is no suggestion that Margaash posed any immediate threat to any human. The zoo described the killing as "euthanasia". Protests followed as outraged locals strongly disagreed with the killing of Margaash, describing it as "needless killing".

Animals

In 2003, in common with other urban zoos, Dudley parted with their two female African elephants so that they could benefit from more spacious surroundings. The remaining large animals include giraffes, tigers, lions, reindeer, wallabies, and three snow leopards, the latest being born in May 2013. Primates are well represented, and there are several aviaries and a reptile house. The zoo has over 1,000 animals from over 200 species; most of these are endangered and are the product of captive breeding programmes.

There was a time where the Dudley Zoo housed polar bears and Southern elephant seals. Cuddles, a male orca, was housed at the zoo from 1971, until his death in February 1974. The dolphin and whale pools were modified seal and sea lions pools with the walls being built up to create more depth. However, these plans fell foul of the local planning laws and the zoo was ordered to return the pools to the original state. As the zoo was not prepared to invest in new purpose built pools the whale Cuddles was put up for sale, but died before being moved, from long-term gastro-intestinal problems. The pools were returned to their original design and now house sea lions.

Mammals
African pygmy goat
Arctic fox
Asian palm civet
Asian small-clawed otter
Asiatic lion
Bactrian camel
Barbary sheep
Bearded emperor tamarin
Binturong
Black howler
Black lemur
Black-and-white ruffed lemur
Bornean orangutan
Bush dog
Capybara
Carpathian lynx
Celebes crested macaque
Chimpanzee
Collared lemur
Colombian spider monkey
Coppery titi
Cotton-top tamarin
Eastern pygmy marmoset
Egyptian fruit bat
Ferret
Gelada
Giant anteater
Giraffe
Golden-bellied capuchin
Goeldi's marmoset
Guinea pig
Lar gibbon
Linnaeus's two-toed sloth
Meerkat
Parma wallaby
Patagonian mara
Red-necked wallaby
Red panda
Red ruffed lemur
Ring-tailed lemur
Reindeer
Seba's short-tailed bat
Snow leopard
South American sea lion
South American tapir
Sumatran tiger
White-faced saki
White-lipped peccary
Wolverine

Birds
American flamingo
Baikal teal
Bali myna
Black-capped lory
Black swan
Blue-and-yellow macaw
Burrowing owl
Chattering lory
Chestnut teal
Chilean flamingo
Cinnamon teal
Coconut lorikeet
Common eider
Common emerald dove
Crested partridge
Demoiselle crane
Elliot's pheasant
Great grey owl
Greater rhea
Green aracari
Himalayan monal
Humboldt penguin
Indian peafowl
Laughing kookaburra
Lilac-breasted roller
Little egret
Luzon bleeding-heart
Mandarin duck
Military macaw
Mindanao bleeding-heart
Northern bald ibis
Northern hawk-owl
Palawan peacock-pheasant
Puna ibis
Rainbow lorikeet
Red-billed teal
Red-breasted goose
Red-crested pochard
Red-crested turaco
Reeves's pheasant
Ringed teal
Rosy-billed pochard
Satyr tragopan
Scarlet ibis
Scarlet macaw
Southern cassowary
Speckled pigeon
Sun parakeet
Victoria crowned pigeon
Vietnamese pheasant
Village weaver
White-faced whistling duck
White-necklaced partridge
Yellow-shouldered amazon

Reptiles
African spurred tortoise
Amazon tree boa
Borneo python
California kingsnake
Central bearded dragon
Coahuilan box turtle
Corn snake
Dumeril's boa
Dwarf crocodile
Eastern blue-tongued skink
Eyed dabb lizard
Giant Asian pond turtle
Hermann's tortoise
Honduran milk snake
Jamaican boa
Madagascar tree boa
Mexican beaded lizard
Mozambique girdled lizard
Pancake tortoise
Philippine sailfin lizard
Rainbow boa
Red-eared slider
Red-tailed green ratsnake
Rhinoceros iguana
San Francisco garter snake
Sinaloan milk snake
Solomon Islands skink
Tokay gecko
Utila spiny-tailed iguana

Amphibians
Argentine horned frog
Axolotl
Fire salamander
Iberian ribbed newt
Lesser siren

Modernist Architecture

The zoo buildings include twelve listed buildings, seven Grade II and five Grade II*, erected in 1937 by Berthold Lubetkin's Tecton Group which employed, among others, structural engineer Ove Arup. Most of the zoo buildings are in the International Style (architecture).

In 2011, the zoo announced refurbishment and renovation plans for the zoo's listed buildings and parts of the zoo itself; totalling £1.15 million. Initial funding for the project has been met by the Heritage Lottery Fund.

In January 2013, newly released construction proposals indicated the entrance to the zoo would connect with the Black Country Museum and the Dudley Canal Trust, creating a single entrance for the three attractions. The new entrance was completed in September 2015. Focus will then shift to the bear pits, which zoo officials say will be renovated to provide "a dramatic backdrop in the landscape". This was the subject of an investigation by the Born Free Foundation in 2012.

In November 2018 a £6 million expansion of the zoo was announced, where tunnels running underneath the Castle Hill site from the Second World War could be brought back, so that visitors can glimpse the mining history of Dudley. The zoo's iconic 1930s Tecton buildings could also be refurbished with this £6 million expansion. This work is expected to begin in 2020.

In February 2019 Dudley Zoo's Director, Derek Grove, has announced plans to renovate animal enclosures and improve visitor facilities. These new renovations include; refurbishing the Lemur walk-through exhibit, adding a new indoor adventure playground, extending the Sumatran Tiger exhibit, and bringing back the European Brown Bears.

Listed Lubetkin and Tecton Buildings at Dudley Zoo 

The Castle Restaurant
The Elephant House
The Entrance Gateway
The Education Centre (formerly the Moat Café)
Tropical Bird House
Sea lion pools
Brown bear ravine
Kiosk south of the former brown bear pit
Former Station Café, now the Safari Shop
Polar Bear Pit and Lion and Tiger Ravines
Kiosk east of the former brown bear pit
The former reptiliary, now the Meerkat Enclosure

A further Tectron building, The Penguin Enclosure, was demolished in the 1960s.

Artistic connections

A painting by Percy Shakespeare, Tropical Bird House, Dudley Zoo (1939), is in Dudley Museum and Art Gallery.

In 2015, 89-year-old artist Rama Samaraweera, who was inspired to paint while a keeper at Dudley Zoo, donated three original oil paintings to the zoo to express his gratitude. His painting Clouded Leopard was a best-selling print in America in the 1970s.

Castle
Access to Dudley Castle, a Grade I listed building built in the 11th century, is included in the zoo entrance fee.

Chairlift
A visitor chairlift was erected between the zoo's entrance and the castle in 1958. It was taken out of use in 2000 due to health and safety concerns. In August 2012 the chairlift was reopened after a 12-week, £117,000 restoration which included returning it to its original light cream colour.

References

External links

The Modernist buildings of Dudley Zoo Film
Dudley Zoo and Berthold Lubetkin Film

Tourist attractions in the West Midlands (county)
Zoos in England
Grade II* listed buildings in the West Midlands (county)
Buildings and structures in Dudley
Modernist architecture in England
Zoos established in 1937
Charities based in the West Midlands (county)
Berthold Lubetkin buildings